Estradiol hemisuccinate (brand name Eutocol), or simply estradiol succinate, also known as estradiol 17β-hemisuccinate, is an estrogen medication and an estrogen ester – specifically, the hemisuccinate ester of estradiol. It is used as a component of hormone replacement therapy for menopause. Like other estrogens, estradiol hemisuccinate has been found to have beneficial effects on the skin, with improvement of skin thickness observed.

Estradiol hemisuccinate is also a component of estradiol hemisuccinate/progesterone (brand name Hosterona), an injectable preparation used to induce withdrawal bleeding in women with amenorrhea.

See also
 Estradiol hemisuccinate/progesterone
 Estriol succinate
 List of estrogen esters § Estradiol esters

References

Estradiol esters
Succinate esters
Synthetic estrogens